The Pakistan national cricket team toured Australia in June 2002, well outside the normal Australian cricket season.  They played 3 One Day Internationals. Pakistan won 2-1.

LOI series summary

1st ODI

2nd ODI

3rd ODI

External links
 cricinfo
 Pakistan in Australia, 2002

References
 Playfair Cricket Annual
 Wisden Cricketers Almanack

Australian cricket seasons from 2000–01
2002 in Australian cricket
2002
2002 in Pakistani cricket